The 2014 Super League season (known as the First Utility Super League XIX due to sponsorship by First Utility) was the 19th season of rugby league football since the Super League format was introduced in 1996. Fourteen teams competed for the League Leaders' Shield over 27 rounds (including the Magic Weekend in Manchester), after which the highest finishing teams will enter the play-offs to compete for a place in the Grand Final and a chance to win the championship and the Super League Trophy.

Teams
Super League XIX will be the third and final year of a licensed Super League. Under this system, promotion and relegation between Super League and Championship was abolished, and 14 teams were granted licences subject to certain criteria. For the 2014 season, all fourteen teams from the previous season will compete, although Salford have changed their names from the City Reds to the Red Devils.

At the end of the season, Super League will be reduced to 12 teams, as part of the re-structuring of Super League and the RFL Championship.

Geographically, the vast majority of teams in Super League are based in the north of England, five teams – Warrington, St. Helens, Salford, Wigan and Widnes – to the west of the Pennines in Cheshire, Greater Manchester and Merseyside, and seven teams to the east in Yorkshire – Huddersfield, Bradford, Wakefield Trinity, Leeds, Castleford, Hull F.C. and Hull Kingston Rovers. Catalans Dragons are the only team based in France and are outside of the UK and London Broncos are the only team to be based in a capital city (London).

Season statistics

Results

The regular league season sees the 14 teams play each other twice (one home, one away) plus an additional match, as part of the Magic Weekend, over 27 matches. The team who finishes 1st at the end of the regular season win the League Leaders' Shield.

Table

Play-offs

The play-offs commenced following the conclusion of the 27-round regular season. To decide the grand finalists from the top eight finishing teams, Super League uses its unique play-off system. The finals concluded with the 2014 Super League Grand Final.

Player statistics

Top try-scorers

Top try assists

Top goalscorers

Top points scorers

Discipline

Red Cards

Yellow Cards

End-of-season awards
Awards are presented for outstanding contributions and efforts to players and clubs in the week leading up to the Super League Grand Final:

 Man of Steel: Daryl Clark, Castleford Tigers
 Coach of the year: Daryl Powell, Castleford Tigers
 Super League club of the year: Widnes Vikings
 Young player of the year: Daryl Clark, Castleford Tigers
 Foundation of the year: Warrington Wolves
 Rhino "Top Gun": 
 Metre-maker: James Roby, St Helens
 Top Try Scorer: Joel Monaghan, Warrington Wolves
 Outstanding Achievement Award: 
 Hit Man:

2014 Transfers

Players

Media

Television
2014 is the third year of a five-year contract with Sky Sports to televise 70 matches per season. The deal which runs until 2016 is worth £90million.

Sky Sports coverage in the UK see two live matches broadcast each week, which will usually be shown at 20:00 on Thursday and Friday nights with the Thursday night fixtures first being adopted at the back-end of the 2013 season.

Regular commentators were Eddie Hemmings and Mike Stephenson with summarisers including Phil Clarke, Brian Carney, Barrie McDermott and Terry O'Connor. Sky will broadcast highlights on Sunday Nights on Super League - Full Time, usually airing at 10pm.

BBC Sport broadcast a highlights programme called the Super League Show, presented by Tanya Arnold. The BBC show two weekly broadcasts of the programme. The first is only to the BBC North West, Yorkshire & North Midlands, North East & Cumbria, and East Yorkshire & Lincolnshire regions on Monday evenings at 23:35 on BBC One, while a repeat showing is shown nationally on BBC Two on Tuesday afternoons at 13:30. The Super League Show is also available for one week after broadcast for streaming or download via the BBC iPlayer in the UK only. End of season play-offs are shown on BBC Two across the whole country in a weekly highlights package on Sunday afternoons.

Internationally, Super League is shown live or delayed on Showtime Sports (Middle East), Māori Television (New Zealand), TV 2 Sport (Norway), NTV+ (Russia), Fox Soccer Plus (United States), Eurosport (Australia) or Sportsnet World (Canada).

Radio

BBC Coverage:

 BBC Radio 5 Live Sports Extra (National DAB Digital Radio) will carry two Super League commentaries each week on Thursday and Friday nights (both kick off 8pm); this will be through the 5 Live Rugby league programme which is presented by Dave Woods with a guest summariser (usually a Super League player or coach) and also includes interviews and debate..
 BBC Radio Humberside will have full match commentary of all Hull KR and Hull matches.
 BBC Radio Leeds carry commentaries featuring Bradford, Leeds, Castleford, Wakefield and Huddersfield.
 BBC Radio Manchester will carry commentary of Wigan and Salford whilst sharing commentary of Warrington with BBC Radio Merseyside.
 BBC Radio Merseyside (will have commentary on St Helens and Widnes matches whilst sharing commentary of Warrington with BBC Radio Manchester.

Commercial Radio Coverage:

 102.4 Wish FM will carry commentaries of Wigan & St Helens matches.
 107.2 Wire FM will carry commentaries on Warrington Home and Away.
 BCB 106.6 (Bradford Community Broadcasting) have full match commentary of Bradford Bulls home and away.
 Radio Yorkshire will launch in March carrying Super League commentaries. 
 Radio Warrington (Online Station) all Warrington home games and some away games.
 Grand Sud FM covers every Catalans Dragons Home Match (in French).
 Radio France Bleu Roussillon covers every Catalans Dragons Away Match (in French).

All Super League commentaries on any station are available via the particular stations on-line streaming.

References

External links
Official Site
BBC Rugby League